The Vandelliinae are a subfamily of catfishes (order Siluriformes) of the family Trichomycteridae. Vandelliines are hematophagous, feeding on the blood of larger fish. Members of this subfamily may be known as candirú, notorious for occasionally entering human bodily orifices, particularly the urethra; no evidence indicates such attacks are anything more than rare and accidental perversions of the usual feeding behaviour of the parasite — it seems unlikely that it would survive in the human body for long, so such an entry should be disastrous for both parties. In the usual course of events, parasitic vandelliines enter the body cavities of host fishes, feed on blood from gill filaments, and leave again.

Vandelliines usually parasitise ostariophysan fishes such as pimelodids, doradids, and characins. The eyes of Vandelliinae species are relatively large among catfishes, indicating sight may be important in prey detection.

References

Trichomycteridae
Ray-finned fish subfamilies
Catfish of South America
Freshwater fish of South America
Taxa named by Pieter Bleeker